"Echoes in Rain" is a single by Irish musician Enya, the first to be taken from the album Dark Sky Island. It was released on 9 October 2015 by Warner Music.

Composition and lyrics
"Echoes in Rain" has a 'buoyant optimism' due to the 'marching' rhythmic ostinatos and pizzicato strings. The a cappella multi-vocal ending was compared to Enya's breakthrough single "Orinoco Flow". "Echoes in Rain" is played in a minor scale (explicitly F-sharp minor). Enya's vocals span 2 octaves from the low note of B2 to the high note of E5. The song includes a piano-based bridge, similar to Enya's piano solo work, and it is the first of her lead singles to do so.

The lyrics describe the feelings of a long journey home, travelling through night and through day, with the verses detailing how the surroundings and emotions change throughout the journey. 

The lyric 'everything flows' is repeated throughout, perhaps referring to "Orinoco Flow". Enya has a few other songs with similar references to the hit song.   In The Memory of Trees the song "On My Way Home" repeats the 'turn it up, adieu' lyric; "Lazy Days" has the lyric 'and how it sails away' in A Day Without Rain, and in And Winter Came... "Miraculum" has Latin lyrics, in which the refrain translates to 'to sail away, a wonderful thing'.

'Here comes another new day' precedes the chorus in "Echoes In Rain", which uses the phrase 'alleluia' to express the joyous feeling that each 'new day' brings and the happiness of returning back home.

Live performances
On 13 December 2015, Enya gave a surprise performance of the song at the Universal Studios Japan Christmas Show. In March 2016, she performed the song on Live! with Kelly and Michael and on April 7, 2016 at the 2016 ECHO Award.

Music video
The music video for "Echoes in Rain" was released on 20 November 2015, the same day as the accompanying album Dark Sky Island. It showed Enya performing the song with the female string ensemble - Wired Strings, and a female choir, in Harrow School in London. The set featured an antique rotating globe, turning as the 'long journey home' the lyrics describe progressed and changed from night to day and back; to emphasise, intense lighting lit the church to represent the day (white, bright lights), and the night (blue, dim lights) of the journey.

Track listing
Single
 "Echoes in Rain" – 3:35

Promo
 "Echoes in Rain" (Radio Edit) – 2:58

Charts

Release history

References

External links
"Echoes in Rain" on Amazon MP3
"Echoes in Rain" on Spotify
Echoes in Rain on iTunes

Enya songs
2015 singles
2015 songs
Reprise Records singles
Songs with music by Enya
Songs with lyrics by Roma Ryan